Dominique Evangeline Bond-Flasza (born 11 September 1996) is a US-born Polish–Jamaican footballer who plays as a right back for the Jamaica women's national team.

Early life
Bond-Flasza was born to a Polish father and a Jamaican mother in New York City, raised in Canada (where she spent 14 years), and grew up in California.

Club career
In 2018, Bond-Flasza played for PSV in Holland. In 2020, Bond-Flasza signed with KKPK Medyk Konin in Poland.

In March 2021, Bond-Flasza signed with newly promoted Tindastóll of the Icelandic top-tier Úrvalsdeild kvenna.

International career
Bond-Flasza plays for Jamaica internationally. She scored the winning penalty to send the Reggaegirlz to the 2019 FIFA Women's World Cup.

International goals
Scores and results list Jamaica's goal tally first

References

External links

Washington Huskies Bio at gohuskies.com

1996 births
Living people
Citizens of Jamaica through descent
Jamaican women's footballers
Jamaican people of Polish descent
Jamaican people of American descent
Women's association football defenders
Eredivisie (women) players
PSV (women) players
Jamaica women's international footballers
2019 FIFA Women's World Cup players
Jamaican expatriate women's footballers
Jamaican expatriate sportspeople in the Netherlands
Expatriate women's footballers in the Netherlands
American emigrants to Canada
Jamaican emigrants to Canada
Polish emigrants to Canada
Citizens of Poland through descent
Polish women's footballers
Polish people of Jamaican descent
Polish people of American descent
Sportspeople of Jamaican descent
Medyk Konin players
Polish expatriate footballers
Polish expatriate sportspeople in the Netherlands
Soccer players from New York City
American women's soccer players
American people of Polish descent
American sportspeople of Jamaican descent
African-American women's soccer players
Washington Huskies women's soccer players
Seattle Sounders Women players
American expatriate women's soccer players
American expatriate sportspeople in the Netherlands
Ungmennafélagið Tindastóll women's football players
Úrvalsdeild kvenna (football) players
21st-century African-American sportspeople
21st-century African-American women